Krosna may refer to:
Krosna, Lithuania
Krosna, Poland
Krosna-Wieś, Poland